Harmony Area High School is a public high school located in the borough of Westover, Pennsylvania.  The high school serves students from most of southwestern Clearfield County, and the borough of Cherry Tree located in Indiana County. The school's mascot is the owl. The school is part of the Harmony Area School District.

References

Public high schools in Pennsylvania
Schools in Clearfield County, Pennsylvania